Hasanagha Turabov (24 March 1938, Baku – 23 February 2003, Baku) was an Azerbaijani and Soviet actor, who starred in leading roles in numerous Azerbaijani films, including Yeddi Ogul Isterem, Babek,  laureate of the State Prize of Azerbaijan SSR (1972), People's Artist of Azerbaijan SSR (1982) the laureate of the Order, a member of the Supreme Soviet of the USSR.

Life 
Turabov was born on 24 March 1938 in Baku and studied at a secondary school No 31 here. After graduating from high school (Azerbaijan Art Institute) he entered Academy of Acting. Since that time he worked as an actor at the Azerbaijan Drama Theater till the end of his life. In 1987-2001 he worked as director and artistic director of the theater. Hasanagha died in 2003. He was buried in the "Gurd Gate" cemetery.

Carrier 
Hasanagha preferred the lyric-psychological style in the scene. Among his roles are Vahid ("The Village Girl"), Azer ("Good Man"), Hamlet ("Hamlet"), Lionel ("The Forest Girl") and Alexander ("Dead") Khayyam ("Khayyam").

The image of Garay in the movie "I want Seven Sons" is one of his most memorable roles. Turabov played the role of "The Last Cross", "The Crocodile Trail", "Heart ... Heart ...", "Joy of Joy", "Anniversary of Dante", "Gem Window", " He was the director of the film "Bloody Land". His last films were Rustam Ibrahimbeyov and Ramiz Hasanoglu's "Family" and Eldar Guliyev's "What a wonderful world!". Hasanagha Turabov was also a professor at the Azerbaijan State University of Culture and Arts.

Awards and honorary titles 

 Honored Artist of the Azerbaijan SSR - 1971
 State Prize laureate of the Azerbaijan SSR - 1972

Filmography

Actor 

1966 - Why are you silent?
 1970 - Sevil
 1970 - My seven sons - Gerai Bey
 1971 - The day passed
 1972 - Flamingo, pink bird - Fazilov
 1972 - I grew up by the sea
 1973 - Happiness to you girls! - Shamsi
 1973 - Fair wind
 1973 - Your first hour
 1974 - The Avenger from Ganjabasar
 1974 - In the footsteps of Charvadars
 1974 - Four Sundays
 1975 - Only clouds are higher
 1976 - The Darvish Detonates Paris
 1976 - Heart ... heart ... - Murad
 1978 - Owl arrived
 1978 - Dante's Anniversary
 1979 - Babek - Afshin
 1979 - Interrogation - General
 1980 - I want to understand
 1980 - I'll be back
 1981 - Do not worry, I'm with you - Jafar
 1982 - Nizami
 1983 - Gachag Nabi
 1984 - The memory of a pomegranate tree
 1984 - Legend of Silver Lake - Agazeki
 1984 - It's time to saddle horses - Nabi
 1984 - The Tale of Old Oak
 1986 - The Window of Sorrow
 1986 - Signal from the sea
 1990 - Murder on the night train
 1992 - Tahmina
 1998 - Family
 1999 - How beautiful is this world

See also 
List of Azerbaijani actors

List of Azerbaijani film directors

List of Azerbaijani film producers

References

External links 
 
 Hasanagha Turabov at cinema.aznet.org
 Hasanagha Turabov 

1938 births
2003 deaths
20th-century Azerbaijani male actors
Azerbaijani male film actors
Soviet male actors
People's Artists of Azerbaijan
Soviet Azerbaijani people
Actors from Baku
Azerbaijan State University of Culture and Arts alumni